Lehigh Carbon Community College (LCCC), often pronounced "L-tri-C," is a public community college in Schnecksville, Pennsylvania, in the Lehigh Valley region of eastern Pennsylvania. The school serves as the primary granter of associate degrees in the Allentown area.

LCCC was founded on March 31, 1966, with the help of John J. Groller, as Lehigh County Community College, and it originally held classes in the former Lehigh County Courthouse. In 1972, modern facilities were constructed, which laid the foundation for its current campus. In order to increase enrollment from nearby Carbon County, the school decided on its current name in 1994.

The college also has learning centers in several off-campus locations, including at the Donley Center in Downtown Allentown, the Carbon Center in Jim Thorpe, and at the John Morgan Center in Tamaqua.

The WXLV Digital Media and Production Lab operates the college radio station, which broadcasts on iHeartRadio as WXLV The X.

References

External links

Official website

1966 establishments in Pennsylvania
Community colleges in Pennsylvania
Educational institutions established in 1966
Universities and colleges in Carbon County, Pennsylvania
Universities and colleges in Lehigh County, Pennsylvania
Universities and colleges in Schuylkill County, Pennsylvania